Santa Lucía Utatlán is a municipality in the Sololá department of Guatemala.

Climate
Santa Lucia Utatlan has a subtropical highland climate (Cwb) dry, cold winters and rainy, cool summers.

References

Municipalities of the Sololá Department